"Too Late to Turn Back Now" is the 1972 follow-up single of Cornelius Brothers & Sister Rose to their debut hit "Treat Her Like a Lady". The single had previously been released in 1970 on the Platinum label.

Written by Eddie Cornelius, the song had great success upon its re-release, peaking at number 5 on the U.S. R&B chart and number 2 on the Billboard Hot 100 (behind "Lean on Me" by Bill Withers). "Too Late to Turn Back Now" went to No. 1 on Cash Box's chart of the Top 100 Singles for the week of July 29, 1972.

"Too Late to Turn Back Now" is ranked as the 34th biggest U.S. hit of 1972. The record was awarded a gold disc on 2 August 1972 for one million sales by the Recording Industry Association of America (RIAA).

The song was featured in the 1997 film The Ice Storm and the 2018 film BlacKkKlansman.

Chart performance

Weekly charts

Year-end charts

See also
List of Cash Box Top 100 number-one singles of 1972

References

External links
 

1972 singles
Cornelius Brothers & Sister Rose songs
United Artists Records singles
1970 songs
Cashbox number-one singles
RPM Top Singles number-one singles